Carl Filip Anton Forsberg (born 13 August 1994) is a Swedish professional ice hockey player and alternate captain for the Nashville Predators of the National Hockey League (NHL). Forsberg was selected by the Washington Capitals in the first round, 11th overall, of the 2012 NHL Entry Draft.

Playing career

Early career
Forsberg had standout performances at both the 2011 Ivan Hlinka Memorial Tournament in Břeclav, Czech Republic, and the World U18 Championships Tournament in Brno, Czech Republic, where he was a member of the silver-medal winning Sweden teams. At the World Juniors in Brno, he was also named Best Forward of the tournament. In the final rankings of NHL Central Scouting, Forsberg was the highest-rated European-based forward available in the 2012 NHL Entry Draft. He was selected 11th overall in the 2012 NHL Entry Draft by the Washington Capitals.

On 13 July 2012, while attending his first Capitals development camp, he signed a three-year, entry-level contract. Forsberg was returned to his former club, Leksands IF, on loan for the duration of the 2012–13 season. He again improved upon his season totals for the third consecutive year to finish with 33 points in 38 games to help Leksand gain promotion to return to the Swedish Hockey League (SHL) for the following season.

Professional career

Nashville Predators
On 3 April 2013, Forsberg was traded to the Nashville Predators in exchange for Martin Erat and Michael Latta. With his Swedish season completed, Forsberg was recalled from his loan and made his NHL debut towards the end of the lockout-shortened 2012–13 season, becoming the third-youngest player to suit up for the Predators, in a 3–0 loss to the Detroit Red Wings on 14 April 2013.

Forsberg scored his first NHL goal on 8 October 2013 against Niklas Bäckström of the Minnesota Wild. He finished the 2013–14 season with five points (one goal and four assists) in 13 games played with the Predators, in addition to 34 points (15 goals and 19 assists) in 47 games with the Predators' American Hockey League (AHL) affiliate, the Milwaukee Admirals.

On 22 January 2015, Forsberg was named to the 2015 NHL All-Star Game in Columbus, replacing the Pittsburgh Penguins' Evgeni Malkin, who pulled out of the game due to injury.

In the 2015 Stanley Cup playoffs, Forsberg became the youngest Nashville Predator to score a playoff goal in franchise history and also recorded the first playoff hat-trick in franchise history in the first round against the Chicago Blackhawks. Forsberg was voted to the playoff NHL All-Rookie Team for the 2014–15 season.

During the 2015–16 season, Forsberg continued to surpass franchise milestones, recording two natural hat-tricks in a four-day span, the shortest time period between natural hat tricks since 1987–88. He also became the youngest Predator to record a regular season hat-trick. Forsberg became the first player in Predators history to record multiple hat-tricks in a single season. He also led the team in scoring for the second consecutive year and set a new career high (64) in points and goals, with 33. His 33 goals tied the Predators' franchise record.
In March 2016, Forsberg was named to Sweden's 2016 World Cup of Hockey roster.

On 27 June 2016, Forsberg agreed to a six-year, $36 million contract to keep him in Nashville through to the 2021–22 season. In late February 2017, Forsberg scored back-to-back hat-tricks against the Calgary Flames and the Colorado Avalanche, making him the first player in Predators history and the first NHL player in over seven years to accomplish the feat.

Prior to the 2017–18 season, Forsberg was named an alternate captain alongside Mattias Ekholm and Ryan Johansen. On 30 December 2017, the Predators placed Forsberg on injured reserve with an undisclosed injury. With this, Forsberg's streak of 325 consecutive games (regular season and playoffs) played came to an end.

During the 2019–20 season, on January 14, 2020, Forsberg successfully scored a "Michigan goal", being only the second player in NHL history to do so, at the time, only behind Andrei Svechnikov of the Carolina Hurricanes.

In the 2021–22 season, Forsberg enjoyed a resurgent year offensively, alongside Matt Duchene and Ryan Johansen. On March 19, 2022, Forsberg surpassed David Legwand as the leading goal scorer in Predators history, scoring his 211th goal in a 6-3 win over the Toronto Maple Leafs. He finished the regular season setting career highs with 42 goals and 42 assists for 84 points in just 69 games.

As a pending free agent for the first-time in his career, Forsberg opted to remain with the Predators after signing an eight-year, $68 million contract extension to stay until the 2029–30 season on 9 July 2022.

Personal life
Forsberg was born to Carina Dahlberg and Patrik Forsberg. At birth, he was named Carl Filip Anton Forsberg, although he is referred to by his second name, "Filip". He has a younger brother, Fredrik Forsberg, who plays hockey in the HV71 organization. The brothers are of no relation to Hockey Hall of Famer Peter Forsberg or Ottawa Senators goaltender Anton Forsberg.

Filip Forsberg married American country singer Erin Alvey on July 23, 2022.

He is a supporter of Liverpool FC.

Forsberg, along with professional basketball players Alex, Thanasis, Kostas, and Giannis Antetokounmpo, were announced as joining the Nashville SC ownership group in the MLS.

Career statistics

Regular season and playoffs

International

Awards

References

External links
 

1994 births
Leksands IF players
Living people
Milwaukee Admirals players
Nashville Predators players
National Hockey League All-Stars
National Hockey League first-round draft picks
People from Heby Municipality
Swedish ice hockey forwards
Washington Capitals draft picks
Swedish expatriate ice hockey players in the United States
Sportspeople from Uppsala County